Judy Hawley is an American retired educator and politician.

Hawley graduated from Knox College in 1967. She was a teacher within the Gregory-Portland Independent School District as well as a tennis coach prior to pursuing a political career. From 1995 to 2003, Hawley was a member of the Texas House of Representatives, occupying the 31st district seat as a Democrat. Hawley then served on the Corpus Christi Port Commission from 2004 until she was term-limited in 2016. She chaired the commission during the final two years of her tenure. In 2019, Hawley was elected to the Texas Transportation Hall of Honor.

References

Living people
Year of birth missing (living people)
20th-century American women educators
20th-century American educators
21st-century American women politicians
21st-century American politicians
Schoolteachers from Texas
20th-century American women politicians
20th-century American politicians
Democratic Party members of the Texas House of Representatives
American tennis coaches
People from Portland, Texas